Toni Pekka Lehtinen (born 5 May 1984) is a Finnish football manager and former player. He is currently the head coach of JJK. Lehtinen was the manager of SJK alongside Brian Page in 2017, because Manuel Roca was sacked.

Playing career

Early career
Lehtinen has previously played for TP-Seinäjoki and was a youth player at English club Peterborough United. He returned to TP-Seinäjoki in 2002.

FC Haka
Toni signed for FC Haka in 2003. He won the Veikkausliiga in 2004 and finished runners up in 2007. He finished as the second highest scorer in the Veikkausliiga in 2004, 2007 and 2008 with 11 league goals in each of those seasons. He won the Veikkausliiga Rookie of the Year award in 2004. He won the Finnish Cup in 2005.

Levadiakos FC, FC Aarau
He joined the Greek club Levadiakos FC in the Super League Greece in January 2009, and joined FC Aarau in the Swiss Super League later that year after the Greek season had ended.

Return to Finland
He returned to FC Haka after the 09/10 season with FC Aarau had finished. Signed for IFK Mariehamn in January 2011.

After only one season with IFK, he left the Mariehamn-based club and signed a five-year contract with SJK in Ykkönen.

International career
Toni made his debut for the Finnish national team against Bahrain in December 2004. He has made 3 appearances for his country.

References

External links
Profile at UpThePosh! The Peterborough United Database

1984 births
Living people
People from Seinäjoki
Finnish footballers
Finnish expatriate footballers
Expatriate footballers in Switzerland
Expatriate footballers in Greece
Finland international footballers
Veikkausliiga players
Super League Greece players
Swiss Super League players
Peterborough United F.C. players
FC Haka players
FC Aarau players
Levadiakos F.C. players
IFK Mariehamn players
Seinäjoen Jalkapallokerho players
Association football forwards
Sportspeople from South Ostrobothnia